The 2016–17 UEFA Champions League knockout phase began on 14 February and ended on 3 June 2017 with the final at Millennium Stadium in Cardiff, Wales, to decide the champions of the 2016–17 UEFA Champions League. A total of 16 teams competed in the knockout phase.

Times are CET/CEST, as listed by UEFA (local times, if different, are in parentheses).

Round and draw dates
The schedule of the competition was as follows (all draws were held at the UEFA headquarters in Nyon, Switzerland, unless stated otherwise).

Format
The knockout phase involved the 16 teams which qualified as winners and runners-up of each of the eight groups in the group stage.

Each tie in the knockout phase, apart from the final, was played over two legs, with each team playing one leg at home. The team that scored more goals on aggregate over the two legs advanced to the next round. If the aggregate score was level, the away goals rule was applied, i.e. the team that scored more goals away from home over the two legs advanced. If away goals were also equal, then thirty minutes of extra time was played. The away goals rule was again applied after extra time, i.e. if there were goals scored during extra time and the aggregate score was still level, the visiting team advanced by virtue of more away goals scored. If no goals were scored during extra time, the tie was decided by penalty shoot-out. In the final, which was played as a single match, if scores were level at the end of normal time, extra time was played, followed by a penalty shoot-out if scores remained tied.

The mechanism of the draws for each round was as follows:
In the draw for the round of 16, the eight group winners were seeded, and the eight group runners-up were unseeded. The seeded teams were drawn against the unseeded teams, with the seeded teams hosting the second leg. Teams from the same group or the same association could not be drawn against each other.
In the draws for the quarter-finals onwards, there were no seedings, and teams from the same group or the same association could be drawn against each other.

Qualified teams

Bracket

Round of 16
The draw was held on 12 December 2016. The first legs were played on 14, 15, 21 and 22 February, and the second legs were played on 7, 8, 14 and 15 March 2017.

Summary

|}

Matches

6–6 on aggregate; Monaco won on away goals.

Real Madrid won 6–2 on aggregate.

Borussia Dortmund won 4–1 on aggregate.

Bayern Munich won 10–2 on aggregate.

Juventus won 3–0 on aggregate.

Atlético Madrid won 4–2 on aggregate.

Barcelona won 6–5 on aggregate.

Leicester City won 3–2 on aggregate.

Quarter-finals
The draw was held on 17 March 2017. The first legs were played on 11 and 12 April, and the second legs were played on 18 and 19 April 2017.

Summary

|}

Matches

Atlético Madrid won 2–1 on aggregate.

Monaco won 6–3 on aggregate.

Real Madrid won 6–3 on aggregate.

Juventus won 3–0 on aggregate.

Semi-finals
The draw was held on 21 April 2017. The first legs were played on 2 and 3 May, and the second legs were played on 9 and 10 May 2017.

Summary

|}

Matches

Real Madrid won 4–2 on aggregate.

Juventus won 4–1 on aggregate.

Final

The final was played on 3 June 2017 at Millennium Stadium in Cardiff, Wales. The "home" team (for administrative purposes) was determined by an additional draw held after the semi-final draw.

Notes

References

External links
2016–17 UEFA Champions League

Knockout Phase
2016-17